The Journal of Telemedicine and Telecare is a peer-reviewed journal covering the field of telemedicine and e-health. The journal is a member of the Committee on Publication Ethics (COPE). The journal's Editor in Chief is Anthony Smith (University of Queensland, Australia). It has been in publication since 1995 and is published by SAGE Publishing.

Abstracting and indexing 
The journal is abstracted and indexed in:

References

External Links 

SAGE Publishing academic journals
Publications established in 1995
English-language journals
10 times per year journals